Vana-Vastseliina is a village in Võru Parish, Võru County in southeastern Estonia.

Vana-Vastseliina is the location of the ruins of medieval Vastseliina Castle, built by the Livonian Order in 1342.

References

Villages in Võru County